Celvetîyye Tariqat or Jelveti is a Sufi order that was founded by "Akbıyık Sultan", a murid of Haji Bayram Veli in Bursa as "The tariqat of Bayramiyye-î Celvetîyye" and later reorganized by the  Turkish saint Aziz Mahmud Hudayi. It shares the same spiritual chain as the Khalwati order and thus there are many similarities between them. The two orders split however with Sheikh Zahed Gilani, where the Jelveti order then goes on to Hajji Bayram and Aziz Mahmud Hudayi. Aziz Mahmud Hudayi was among the most famous of all Ottoman Sufi's being the Sheikh of Sultan Ahmed I who constructed the famous Blue Mosque. Aziz Mahmud Hudayi read the first Friday prayer in this mosque on its opening.

The Jelveti order was not as widespread and did not extend much further than the borders of modern Turkey having a number of tekkes in the Balkans. Among the most famous of Jelveti Sheikhs are Ismail Hakki Bursevi of Bursa, Osman Fazli, and Sheikh Mustafa Devati. A prominent Jelveti sheikh in Ottoman Bosnia was Mustafa Gaibi. Aziz Mahmud Hudayi is buried in Üsküdar, Istanbul and is something of the patron saint of Asian Istanbul.

See also 
 Khalwati order 

Sunni Sufi orders